The Tasmanian Government Railways M class is a class of 4-6-2 steam locomotives operated by the Tasmanian Government Railways.

History
On 12 March 1952, the Tasmanian Government Railways (TGR) took delivery of ten M class branch line locomotives from Robert Stephenson and Hawthorns, Newcastle-upon-Tyne. The locomotives were similar to the Indian Railways YB class.

They were allocated to operate on the North-Eastern and Western lines and at Hobart. However with the TGR having already commenced dieselisation with the X class, some of the lines intended for M class operation had already been converted. Hence in 1957, four were fitted with smaller driving wheels recovered from withdrawn Australian Standard Garratts enabling them to operate heavier trains over the steeply graded North-Eastern line.

As they fell due for overhaul, they were withdrawn from 1960, with the last removed from traffic in 1975.

Preservation
All members of the class have been preserved to an extent, with four locomotives seeing further use on heritage trains.

Namesake
The M class designation was previously used by the M class, the last of which was withdrawn in 1931.

References

Railway locomotives introduced in 1952
Robert Stephenson and Hawthorns locomotives
Steam locomotives of Tasmania
3 ft 6 in gauge locomotives of Australia
4-6-2 locomotives